= Bainbridge Crist =

"Lucien" Bainbridge Crist (February 13, 1883 – February 7, 1969) was an American composer, conductor, and teacher.

Crist created 186 works in 260 publications in three languages and 1,025 library holdings.

Crist's work, such as "Egyptian Impressions", suite (first performed in America at the Boston Pops, June 22, 1915) and his popular "Chinese Mother Goose Rhymes" were well received and widely known in America.
